Irishtown is a community located in Westmorland County, New Brunswick, Canada. The community is situated in southeastern New Brunswick, to the north of Moncton on Route 115.

The special service area of Irishtown within the local service district of the parish of Moncton takes its name from the community.

History
Irishtown was founded in 1820 by Irish families who settled in the area.

Places of note
Irishtown Community Centre
Maplewood Golf & Country Club
Mountain View School
St. Lawrence O'Toole Catholic Church
Irish First Settlers Monument     
Irishtown nature park
Christmas lights house
Irishtown grocery

Notable people

See also
List of communities in New Brunswick

References

Bordering communities

Communities in Westmorland County, New Brunswick
Communities in Greater Moncton